is a Japanese toy company and animation studios, owned by Sega Sammy Holdings. The company was founded when Yonezawa Toys, Japan's largest post-war toy manufacturer, was absorbed into Sega in 1991 as Sega-Yonezawa.

Sega Toys have created toys for children's franchises such as Oshare Majo: Love and Berry, Mushiking: King of the Beetles, Lilpri, Bakugan, Jewelpet, Rilu Rilu Fairilu, Dinosaur King, and Hero Bank. Products by Sega Toys released in the West include the Homestar and the iDog. Sega Toys also inherited the Sega Pico handheld system and produced software for the console.

History 

 (known also as Yone or simply Y) was founded in the 1950s in Tokyo. It was one of Japan's largest and most prodigious post-war toy manufacturers and an early participant in the growing radio control market. It is a former subsidiary of Union Carbide as toy division.

The company and focused on the production of thousands of different electrically operated and mechanical toys through the early 1970s.  Some were branded not as Yonezawa but as STS.  It is unclear as to the origin of the STS label, but it is presumed to be that of an importer.
Yonezawa briefly dabbled in radio control in the mid-1980s with the introduction of the 1/10-scale Wave Hunter buggy, sold in North America as the Monogram Lightning.

Under Sega’s leadership, Yonezawa Toys was briefly known as Sega-Yonezawa until the Yonezawa branding was dropped entirely in April 1998. Once Sega Sammy Holdings was formed, Sega Toys was reorganized under Sega’s entertainment contents business.

Since the early 2000s, Sega Toys markets itself distinctively from the Sega brand, with some occasional collaboration between the two. An example of their collaboration is Sega and Sega Toys producing the UFO Catcher prize games jointly, where Sega manufactures the arcade equipment, while Sega Toys produces the prizes.

Notes

References 

 
Toy brands
Japanese companies established in 1950
Japanese companies established in 1991
Manufacturing companies based in Tokyo
Multinational companies headquartered in Japan
Sega Sammy Holdings
Toy companies of Japan
Japanese die-cast toys
Manufacturing companies established in 1950